Emma Elina Kimiläinen (born 8 July 1989 in Helsinki) is a Finnish racing driver. She currently competes in the W Series.

Biography

Motorsport
Kimiläinen entered professional motor racing in 2005, competing in the Northern European Formula Ford Championship. She was fifth in her first season, scoring a string of rookie awards along the way, and was tied on points with series champion Sami Isohella in 2006 however finished second on count-back (4 wins to Isohella's 5). She remained in Northern Europe in 2007, racing Radicals in Sweden.

Audi then picked up the young Finn in 2008, and placed her in their Formula Masters series. Team-mate to future Formula One driver Kevin Magnussen, she finished 10th in the standings with a highlight of 2nd at Assen; however Audi cut back her funding following the 2008 Global Financial Crisis and she ended up funding her own way into Formula Palmer Audi in 2009. She ended the season fifth in the standings with four podium finishes. However, with no more support from Audi and a lack of personal funds to maintain her racing career, she took an indefinite hiatus from motorsport and started a family after 2009. Kimiläinen had been in contact with an Indy Lights team for 2010, however this was abandoned after it was revealed a team sponsor wanted her to produce adult content for them.

In 2014, she received a surprise call-up from PWR Racing to complete the full Scandinavian Touring Car Championship season, making her the first woman to race in the STCC since Nettan Lindgren-Jansson in 1999. She was retained for 2015 and 2016, however injury prevented her from completing the full 2016 season following a crash in the opening round at Skövde in which she strained her neck. She switched to the Swedish V8 ThunderCar series for 2017, before announcing plans to compete in the Electric GT Championship for 2018 – which was subsequently delayed and then later cancelled altogether.

She competed in the W Series for 2019 as one of the seasons' 18 permanent drivers. She qualified well for the opening round at the Hockenheimring, however was involved in a crash with Megan Gilkes that re-ignited her neck injury and forced her out of the following two rounds. She finished fifth on her return at the Norisring and followed that with a grand slam (pole position, fastest lap, race win) at Assen. She would finish second in a race-long fight with Alice Powell in the series finale at Brands Hatch, enabling her to leapfrog Fabienne Wohlwend for fifth in the championship. Following a coronavirus-induced break from racing in 2020, Kimiläinen returned to W Series in 2021 and finished third in the championship with a win at Spa and four other podiums. In 2022 she participated in the Race of Champions replacing Valtteri Bottas who was to race but did not due to a agreement with Alfa Romeo F1 Team so Kimiläinen raced alongside Mika Häkkinen

Personal life
Alongside her racing, Kimiläinen also works as a radio and television host – most notably producing Finland's Worst Driver for MTV3.

She was married to Timo Liuski between 2012 and 2021, with a daughter born in 2013. She is currently in a relationship with former Finnish footballer Sami Hyypiä, some 16 years her senior.

Racing record

Career summary

Complete Scandinavian Touring Car Championship results

(key) (Races in bold indicate pole position) (Races in italics indicate fastest lap)

Complete W Series results

(key) (Races in bold indicate pole position) (Races in italics indicate fastest lap)

References

External links

Profile at Driver Database
Website

Finnish racing drivers
Female racing drivers
1989 births
Living people
Sportspeople from Helsinki
W Series drivers
Formula Ford drivers
ADAC Formel Masters drivers
Van Amersfoort Racing drivers
21st-century Finnish women